Allen Butterworth  (21 June 1939–24 June 1974) was a British archaeologist and museum curator.

Biography
Butterworth was born in Stockport. He took undergraduate studies in Latin, Greek, and Romano-British Archaeology at the University of Leeds before a post-graduate diploma in Prehistoric European Archaeology from the University of London.

He joined Leicester Museums in 1964 before being appointed Keeper of Antiquities at Sheffield City Museums in 1966, eventually becoming the Deputy Director there in 1968. On 2 November 1970 he became the Keeper of the Yorkshire Museum, a position he kept until his sudden death on 24 June 1974. He was a member of the Museums Association and an examiner for the Museums Diploma, and was a member of the International Committee for Archaeology and History.

Publications
1968. with Salter, A. and Sands, T. S., Souvenir guide. Sheffield: City Museums.
1971. "A Middle Bronze Age Dagger from Lindrick Dale, West Riding of Yorkshire", Yorkshire Archaeological Journal 42 (Part 168), 97-398.
1972. with Lewis, G. D. Prehistoric & Roman times in the Sheffield area. Sheffield: City Museums.
1972. "The Collections of the Yorkshire Museum", Annual Report of the Yorkshire Philosophical Society for 1971. 83-84.

References

1939 births
1974 deaths
Yorkshire Museum people
People from Stockport
British curators
British archaeologists
Alumni of the University of Leeds
20th-century archaeologists